Tremayne Dequette Smartt (born 17 September 1985) is a Guyanese cricketer who plays for Guyana. She plays as a right-arm medium bowler and right-handed batter. Between 2009 and 2018, she appeared in 57  One Day Internationals and 58 Twenty20 Internationals for the West Indies. In 2010, along with Stacy-Ann King, she set the record for the highest third wicket partnership in a Twenty20 International, with 124 runs: they held the record for 9 years, and it is now the third-highest partnership for the third wicket.

References

External links

1985 births
Living people
Guyanese women cricketers
West Indian women cricketers
West Indies women One Day International cricketers
West Indies women Twenty20 International cricketers